Cumings is an unincorporated community and census-designated place (CDP) in Fort Bend County, Texas, United States. The population was 981 at the 2010 census.

History
The town was established in the early 1990s.

Geography

Cumings is located north of the center of Fort Bend County at  (29.573483, -95.803286). It is bordered to the south and west by the city of Rosenberg. The southern and eastern edge of Cumings is the Brazos River.

Demographics
As of the census of 2000, there were 683 people, 172 households, and 156 families residing in the CDP. The population density was 225.6 people per square mile (87.0/km2). There were 186 housing units at an average density of 61.4 per square mile (23.7/km2). The racial makeup of the CDP was 60.76% White, 0.29% Asian, 35.43% from other races, and 3.51% from two or more races. Hispanic or Latino of any race were 91.65% of the population.

There were 172 households, out of which 50.6% had children under the age of 18 living with them, 70.9% were married couples living together, 13.4% had a female householder with no husband present, and 9.3% were non-families. 8.1% of all households were made up of individuals, and 2.9% had someone living alone who was 65 years of age or older. The average household size was 3.97 and the average family size was 4.16.

In the CDP, the population was spread out, with 34.8% under the age of 18, 13.0% from 18 to 24, 29.6% from 25 to 44, 16.7% from 45 to 64, and 5.9% who were 65 years of age or older. The median age was 27 years. For every 100 females, there were 98.5 males. For every 100 females age 18 and over, there were 99.6 males.

The median income for a household in the CDP was $36,316, and the median income for a family was $36,776. Males had a median income of $25,847 versus $16,641 for females. The per capita income for the CDP was $10,399. About 24.0% of families and 20.5% of the population were below the poverty line, including 14.7% of those under age 18 and 56.8% of those age 65 or over.

Education
Cumings is within the Lamar Consolidated Independent School District.

Zoned schools include:
 Jackson Elementary School
 Briscoe Junior High School
 Foster High School

References

External links
 CUMINGS, TX at Handbook of Texas

Census-designated places in Fort Bend County, Texas
Census-designated places in Texas
Unincorporated communities in Fort Bend County, Texas
Unincorporated communities in Texas
Greater Houston